USS Clarion (AK-172) was an  commissioned by the U.S. Navy for service in World War II. She was responsible for delivering troops, goods and equipment to locations in the war zone.

Construction
Clarion was launched 22 October 1944, by Froemming Brothers, Inc., Milwaukee, Wisconsin, under a Maritime Commission contract, MC hull 2145; acquired by the Navy 10 May 1945; and commissioned 27 May 1945.

Service history

World War II Pacific Theatre operations
After loading cargo at Gulf of Mexico ports, Clarion sailed for Pearl Harbor, which she reached 21 July 1945. Three days later she got underway for San Francisco, California, to load cargo for Manila, where she arrived 1 October. Carrying cargo to support occupation activities, she called at Jinsen, Korea, and Tsingtao, Taku, and Shanghai, China, before sailing for the U.S. East Coast from Tsingtao 21 January 1946.

Post-war decommissioning
She reached Norfolk 11 March, and was decommissioned at Baltimore, Maryland, 13 May 1946. On 18 May 1946 she was transferred to the War Shipping Administration.

Merchant service
Clarion was removed by Dichman, Wright and Pugh, 25 February 1947, from the Reserve Fleet, under a GAA contract. It was sold to Norway, 7 March 1947, for $693,862. She was reflagged for Norway and renamed Livdal, or Løvdal. She wrecked off of the coast of Peru, 26 April 1970.

Notes

Citations

Bibliography

External links

 

Alamosa-class cargo ships
Clarion County, Pennsylvania
Ships built in Milwaukee
1944 ships
World War II auxiliary ships of the United States